In February 2017, heavy rainfall damaged Oroville Dam's main and emergency spillways, prompting the evacuation of more than 180,000 people living downstream along the Feather River and the relocation of a fish hatchery.

Heavy rainfall during the 2017 California floods damaged the main spillway on February 7, so the California Department of Water Resources stopped the spillway flow to assess the damage and contemplate its next steps. The rain eventually raised the lake level until it flowed over the emergency spillway, even after the damaged main spillway was reopened. As water flowed over the emergency spillway, headward erosion threatened to undermine and collapse the concrete weir, which could have sent a 30-foot (10 m) wall of water into the Feather River below and flooded communities downstream. No collapse occurred, but the water further damaged the main spillway and eroded the bare slope of the emergency spillway.

Background
Oroville Dam, an important part of the California State Water Project, is an earthen embankment dam on the Feather River, east of the city of Oroville in Northern California. The dam is used for flood control, water storage, hydroelectric power generation, and water quality improvement in the Sacramento–San Joaquin River Delta. The adjacent Edward Hyatt Powerplant has six power-generating turbines with a total installed capacity of 819 megawatts (MW) of electricity.

For flood control purposes, some space in Oroville Reservoir has to be kept dry to capture floodwaters, a practice that has caused controversy at other dams of California over the amounts of water wasted. Dam operators were required to discharge water based on charts contained in the Oroville Dam Reservoir Regulation Manual, a flood-control manual developed by the U.S. Army Corps of Engineers. At the time of the incident, the Oroville Dam Reservoir Regulation Manual had last been updated in 1970 and the discharge charts were based on climatological data and runoff projections that did not account for climate change or significant floods in 1986 and 1997. In the immediate aftermath of the incident, it was not clear if the outdated manual was a significant factor in the February 2017 crisis. The Final Report of the Independent Review Board, released 11 months after the crisis, did not cite the outdated manual as a significant factor.

The dam complex was designed with four routes for water to pass from Lake Oroville:
 Through the main (service) spillway located on the northwest abutment of the dam, which is used to control the height of the reservoir by quickly releasing large amounts of excess water down a  concrete-lined channel that extends to the river below. Water flow onto the main spillway is controlled by eight radial (Tainter) gates that have a combined maximum discharge capacity of  when the lake elevation is 905 feet.

In 2005, the dam underwent re-licensing by the Federal Energy Regulatory Commission, during which three environmental advocacy groups filed a motion with the FERC raising concerns about use of the emergency spillway. The environmental advocacy groups stated a 2002 technical memorandum by the Yuba County Water Agency that noted that significant erosion of the hillside would occur if the emergency spillway is used, which could cause significant downstream damage and impair operation of the Edward Hyatt Powerplant. The groups urged the FERC to condition renewal of the Oroville Dam's license on the lining of the slope of the emergency spillway with concrete and to update the Oroville Dam Reservoir Regulation Manual.

According to FERC engineering guidelines, "Emergency spillways may be used to obtain a high degree of hydrologic safety with minimal additional cost. Because of their infrequent use it is acceptable for them to sustain significant damage when used and they may be designed with lower structural standards than used for auxiliary spillways." The FERC determined that the emergency spillway structure was compliant with its engineering standards and that the erosion concerns raised by the environmental advocacy groups were overblown. The commission also determined that the emergency spillway could handle  of discharge and renewed the dam's license without requiring the concrete lining of the emergency spillway, estimated to cost over $100 million. A 2018 study by the Association of State Dam Safety Officials discovered that the commission relied on original geology reports from the 1960s, stating that the hillside below the emergency spillway was bedrock; it was actually weathered rock subject to deep erosion if the spillway were to be put into use.

Prior to February 2017, the main spillway had been last inspected in August 2016. During that inspection, the spillway was visually inspected without inspectors entering the spillway chute. Inspectors entered the spillway chute for inspections in 2014 and 2015 without finding any concerns. Cracks in the concrete spillway chute were repaired in 2009 and 2013.

Timeline of crisis

Main spillway damage
In early February 2017, high inflows to Lake Oroville caused dam operators to start using the concrete main spillway to control the lake level. Between February 6–10, 2017,  of rain fell on the Feather River Basin. The flow of water down the spillway was stopped for investigation, revealing a crater about halfway down the spillway where the concrete lining was eroded through and water was escaping the concrete chute. The DWR consulted with FERC and other dam safety agencies about the issue and prepared for the possibility of using the emergency spillway.

The DWR was then confronted with two choices: use the main spillway, knowing it would likely be further damaged, or allow Lake Oroville to rise until it overtopped the emergency spillway.

On February 9, the main spillway was reopened. DWR hoped that using the damaged spillway with a limited flow could drain the lake enough to avoid use of the emergency spillway, which would potentially damage powerlines servicing the hydroelectric plant.

Emergency spillway damage

As the lake level rose, measures were taken to prepare the emergency spillway for use. On February 10, 2017, workers began clear-cutting trees on the hillside below the emergency spillway.

Shortly after 8:00 am on February 11, 2017, the emergency spillway began carrying water for the first time since the dam's construction in 1968. Because the spillway was a separate structure from the dam, officials stated that there was no danger of the main embankment being breached, and evacuation of Oroville was not considered at that time, as officials stated that there was no threat to public safety.

Erosion at the base of the weir—which was expected—progressed much faster than anticipated. The headward erosion of the emergency spillway threatened to undermine and collapse the concrete weir, in which case a  wall of water would be sent into the Feather River below and flood communities downstream. Fearing a collapse, the Butte County Sheriff's Office issued an evacuation order of the Oroville area. Several hours later, water stopped flowing over the weir onto the emergency spillway and officials began assessing the state of the emergency spillway.

Evacuation of the Feather River Basin

On February 12, 2017, evacuation was ordered for those in low-lying areas along the Feather River Basin in Butte, Yuba and Sutter counties, because of an anticipated failure of the emergency spillway. Specifically, erosion on the hillside was growing uphill toward the concrete lip of the emergency spillway, leading to the fear that it would collapse. A failure of the concrete top of the spillway would allow up to  vertical of Lake Oroville through the gap in an uncontrolled deluge.

By 9 p.m. on the evening of February 12, the increased flow had successfully lowered the water level to below the emergency spillway top, causing the emergency spillway to stop overflowing. The stop in water flow allowed the erosion there to be hastily inspected and stabilized with boulders.  Engineers worried that the damage would be transferred to the main spillway, not only making future repairs more expensive, but also that the damage to the main spillway could grow uphill to the point that it endangered the main spillway gates, leaving no safe way to release water. The extent of such damage was unknown; it was expected to be assessed on the morning of February 13. On February 13 helicopters began to drop sandbags and large rocks in the area of the now-dry emergency spillway, in order to protect the base from erosion. By February 13, 188,000 people in the vicinity were reported evacuated. About 23,000 National Guardsmen were ordered to be ready for "immediate deployment if the dam spillway should fail" to help with evacuation and relief efforts. On February 14, at 2:45PM local time, the evacuation order above was reduced to an evacuation watch by emergency management officials and the State of California Department of Water Resources, and people were allowed to return to the evacuated areas.

Downstream effects

The immediate harm from the damage is limited to the area downstream of the breach, eroding the hillside to form a canyon. However, a major danger is that the spillway can erode back up toward the gate because of being undercut by the water falling into the crater. Eventually, this would threaten the spillway gate, in close proximity to the actual abutment of the dam.

About  of erosion debris clogged the channel of the Feather River below the dam, preventing release of water from the hydroelectric plant, thus reducing the overall capacity of the dam to release water.  Debris was carried downstream and caused damage to the Feather River Fish Hatchery due to high turbidity. State workers began evacuating fish and eggs from the hatchery in an attempt to mitigate the damage and evacuated over nine million fish downstream to a satellite hatchery adjacent to Thermalito Afterbay.

On February 27, the flow to the spillway was temporarily shut off, allowing crews to begin removing debris in the river in preparation to restart the power plant. After the spillway was shut off, it appeared that headward erosion along the spillway channel had mostly stabilized, reducing the immediate threat of a gate failure and uncontrolled water release. The bedrock under the upper half of the spillway appears to be much stronger than the rock which was washed out under the midsection of the spillway. In addition, the force of the falling water had excavated the original crater into a deep plunge pool which acts as a hydraulic cushion, dissipating much of the energy that otherwise might have caused additional damage to the spillway.

Investigation
The Federal Energy Regulatory Commission (FERC) ordered the California Department of Water Resources (DWR) to assemble a team of five independent experts to assess the dam and issue recommendations. On February 17, 2017, the DWR commissioned an independent Board of Consultants (BOC) to investigate causes, review and comment on repairs to Oroville Dam. Memoranda (reports) prepared by the BOC are posted at the DWR web site. DWR also assembled an Independent Forensic Team (IFT) to determine the cause of the spillways incident, including effects of operations, management, structural design and geological conditions, and the IFT published a nearly 600-page report in January 2018. The DWR also requested  full-time FERC staff to provide immediate oversight, review, and approval of repair plans that would make the dam safe for the 2017–18 flood season.

Department of Water Resources 2017–18 Operations Plan

The DWR prepared a Lake Oroville 2017/2018 Flood Control Season Operations Plan.

Public hearings
On May 11, 2017, a hearing took place. During the hearing, California Department of Water Resources came under criticism for ignoring warning signs in the spillway's designs. Butte County Supervisor also complained that DWR had broken promise with Oroville, as the county had to spend $5.3 million annually for dam-related services, while getting no compensation from the state. Witnesses also stated that DWR did not take safety seriously.

Repairs

The main spillway was successfully reconstructed by November 1, 2018.

According to its 2017–18 operations plan, the DWR maintained Lake Oroville at a lower than normal level to reduce the possibility that the spillway would have to be used the following winter.

In a second phase of spillway repairs in 2018–19, temporary repairs on the main spillway done during Phase 1 were being torn out and replaced with steel-reinforced structural concrete.

References

External links

 Oroville Spillways Incident, California Department of Water Resources
Photogallery of the incident from the California Department of Water Resources
Dramatic Satellite Images Show the Oroville Dam from Drought to Overflow
Independent Forensic Team Report

2017 in California
Disasters in California
Feather River
Floods in California
2017 floods in the United States
February 2017 events in the United States
Dam failures in the United States
History of Butte County, California
History of Sutter County, California
History of Yuba County, California